Rostam and Sohrab is an opera by Loris Tjeknavorian. It is based on the story Rostam and Sohrab in the epic Shahnameh. Its composition took 25 years. In 1963, Carl Orff granted Loris Tjeknavorian a scholarship which allowed him to reside in Salzburg and to complete his opera in Austria.

Iranian director Behrouz Gharibpour brought Rostam and Sohrab to the stage as a puppet show in October 2006. It was first puppet show in Iran to feature the tale. The show involves 100 marionettes and 15 puppeteers and it was first performed in Tehran's Ferdowsi Hall in 2005.

See also
Music of Iran
Persian theatre

References

External links
Documentary film about Rostam & Sohrab puppet opera

Operas
Persian-language operas
1963 operas
2005 operas
Operas based on literature
Operas by Loris Tjeknavorian
Works based on Shahnameh